Ramo is a Turkish crime drama and action television series written by Yılmaz Şahin and directed by Yağız Alp Akaydın, starring Murat Yıldırım in the titular role. This show is about a feud between two families and a love story between Ramo (Yıldırım) and Si̇bel (Esra Bilgiç). It was filmed in Adana, Turkey and premiered on 14 January 2020.

It airs on Show TV. The show has been well received in Turkey as well as in Pakistan.

Plot

Season 1 
The first season premiered  on 14 January 2020 and ended on 24 March 2020 with 11 episodes.

Ramo is a young man who works in Adana, he is the leader of his neighbourhood Taskapi and its local gang known as the Pumpers. His family smuggles gasoline and oil, work under Cengiz (played by Kerem Atabeyoglu) who is the underground leader of Adana.

After seeing the mistreatment his family gets from Cengiz, Ramo decides to become the leader of Adana by killing Cengiz, for this, he executes a plan. As the first step, Ramo retains the drugs which are supposed to be delivered to the mafia leader in Istanbul. In this way, he aims to square Cengiz. However, before he does this his childhood friend Boz (played by Gorkem Sevindik) beats Nico (played by İlhan Şen) who is the son of Cengiz. As a test of loyalty; Cengiz asks Ramo to kill Boz.

Meanwhile, Ramo comes across his first love Sibel (Esra Bilgic) (who is the daughter of Cengiz) throughout this process. She finds herself in the middle of the war between her father and her lover.

Season 2

Cast and characters

Main Characters 
 Ramo (Murat Yıldırım) The main character of the series. He is the leader of his neighbourhood Taskapi and its local gang known as the Pumpers who works for Cengiz by smuggling gasoline and oil, After mistreatment given to his family, he seeks to topple Cengiz.
 Si̇bel (Esra Bilgiç) The female lead character, she is a well-educated woman who is the daughter of Cengiz and the love interest of Ramo. Her complicated relationship with Ramo when he and her father fight plays out as a main plot of the story. 
 Cengiz (Kerem Atabeyoğlu)he is the underground boss of Adana and the father of Sibel and Neco.
 Hasan (Ilker Aksum) Ramo's brother.
 Sharif (Emre Kınay): He's one of the three big bosses running Istanbul. He was shot dead by Ramo.
 Neco/ Necati (İlhan Şen): Sibel's brother, Fatma/ Fatos husband
 Fatma/ Fatos (Cemre Baysel): Ramo's sister, Neco´s wife

Supporting Characters 

 Sebahat (Sacide Taşaner): Ramo's mother.
 Disaster (Legend Odag): Hasan's wife.

Seasons

Episodes

Season 1

Season 2

References

External links

Turkish drama television series
2020s Turkish television series debuts
Turkish-language television shows